Russ Nicholson is a British illustrator, best known for his black and white fantasy art.

Education
Russ studied at Duncan of Jordanstone College of Art and Design in Scotland which later became part of Dundee University.  He moved to England in the 1970s where, save for a brief sojourn in Papua New Guinea, he's lived and worked ever since.

Career
Russ has contributed to many notable game-related titles, such as The Warlock of Firetop Mountain, the first in the illustrated series of Fighting Fantasy game books by Steve Jackson and Ian Livingstone; further illustrating 16 more in the series. He also illustrated many creatures in the original UK contribution to the first edition of the Fiend Folio Advanced Dungeons and Dragons game book, the six original published "episodes" of 'The Fabled Lands' created by Dave Morris and Jamie Thomson, and numerous Games Workshop products, including Warhammer Fantasy Battle, Warhammer Fantasy Roleplay, Warhammer 40,000 and in their magazine White Dwarf.

His work has been reproduced in over twenty countries. He also spent many years as college art lecturer. In addition, he drew the album cover (False Weavers) for Santa Cruz anarcho-folk punk band, Blackbird Raum.

References

External links
Russ Nicholson's blog
1

Alumni of the University of Dundee
British illustrators
British speculative fiction artists
Fantasy artists
Fighting Fantasy
Games Workshop artists
Living people
Role-playing game artists
Year of birth missing (living people)